Serbian Kormchaia was a medieval Roman law book in Serbian redaction of Old Church Slavonic, connected to Saint Sava and his Zakonopravilo, used in Russia. It was used at the Russian courts in the 13th century. In the second half of the 13th century, Russian versions were made.

References

Legal history of Russia
Medieval legal codes of Serbia
Russia–Serbia relations
13th-century books
13th century in Serbia
13th century in Russia
Old Church Slavonic literature
Cyrillic manuscripts
Serbian language